Meril-Prothom Alo Critics Choice Award for Best Film Actress is given by Meril-Prothom Alo as part of its annual Meril-Prothom Alo Awards for Bengali-language films actress.

Superlatives

Multiple winners 
 2 Wins: Jaya Ahsan

Multiple nominees 
 2 Nominations: Purnima

Winners and nominees

2000s

2010s

See also
 Meril-Prothom Alo Awards for Best Film Actress
 Meril-Prothom Alo Critics Choice Award for Best TV Actress
 Meril-Prothom Alo Awards

References

External links

Critics Choice Award for Best Film Actress
Film awards for lead actress